The 2021 Under-19 Asia Cup was the 9th edition of ACC Under-19 Cup. The cricket tournament was played in United Arab Emirates from 23 December 2021 to 31 December 2021. Eight teams contested in the tournament, including five full members and three qualified members.

Teams

Squads

Group stage

Group A

Group B

Knockout stage

Bracket

Semi-finals

Final

References

External links
 Series home at ESPN Cricinfo

Asian Cricket Council competitions
Asia Cup